Beatrice Campbell (31 July 1922 – 10 May 1979) was an Irish stage and film actress, born in County Down, Northern Ireland,

Biography

Career

After a distinguished London stage career, Campbell entered film in the mid-1940s. She received positive notices internationally for her performances in Silent Dust (1949) and Last Holiday (1950), with Alec Guinness, which remains her best-known role.

Personal life
Her father, John Campbell, was the resident Magistrate of The Custody Court, Belfast.

Campbell was married twice. Her first marriage was to Squadron Leader Michael Robert MacClancy of No. 226 Squadron RAF, who died aged 22, on 12 April 1942 at RAF Hemswell when his aircraft crash landed. A Roman Catholic from Dublin and an alumnus of Belvedere College, he was the son of Michael MacClancy, M.R.C.V.S., and Nancy MacClancy, of Raheny.
 Her second marriage was to actor Nigel Patrick in 1951. They remained married until her death in 1979.

Filmography

References

External links
 
 
 

1922 births
1979 deaths
Film actresses from Northern Ireland
Stage actresses from Northern Ireland
People from County Down
20th-century British actresses